BuyBlue.org was an online consumers' guide designed to help progressives in the United States choose brands that favored their politics. Its editors rated companies based on their campaign contributions and other factors. Its name refers to the popular idea of the U.S. being sharply divided, culturally and politically, into red states and blue states that voted Republican and Democrat, respectively, in the 2000 election.

The website encouraged users to submit articles that criticize or applaud a company's business practices. The submitting user assigned a binary categorical rating of positive or negative with regards to the company's adherence to progressive business practices as described in the article. The absolute number of articles submitted and each submitted article's rating were used to calculate a company's overall rating. A five-point scale ranked a company's degree of progressiveness or regressiveness according to users' submissions.

The website hosted blogs and message boards designed to steer consumers towards businesses favored by the party, to exert direct political pressure on targeted businesses, and to foster activism among the site's users.

Though this website was geared toward liberals, conservatives could also use it to find out which companies are supporting Republicans.

Methodology
The website's editors used public databases and compiled an estimate of political campaign contributions by a company's three highest executive officers, those executives' spouses, the highest executive officer at any subsidiary company, and any PAC registered by that company. The allocation of donations between Democrats and Republicans determined a company's political contribution rating, with higher ratings awarded to companies that primarily donate to Democrats.

Rating categories
The Labor & Human Rights category covers article submissions from sources such as Sweatshop Watch and the National Labor Relations Board that address topics including sweatshops, unions and union busting.
The Environment category covers article submissions from sources such as the Environmental Working Group and Greenpeace that address topics including sustainability, ecosystems and resource recovery.
The Employment Equality category covers article submissions from sources such as the Institute for Women's Policy Research and the Equal Employment Opportunity Commission that address topics including discrimination, domestic partner benefits, and diversity.
The Corporate and Social Responsibility category covers article submissions from sources such as United for a Fair Economy and the Council on Economic Priorities that address topics including charitable contributions, community participation, and product safety and product liability.
The Industry Practices category addresses industry-specific topics.

Spring 2007 shutdown

As of April 23, 2007, the website was shut down, and the following message was posted at the site:

Thanks for your support!

The BuyBlue team would like to thank you for all of your support over the past 2 years, unfortunately we are shutting our virtual doors. We hope that we've been able to educate consumers and inspire people to take action and vote with their wallets. Maybe another group will take up this charge in the future, but for now we can no longer do so.
Just because we won't be online any more does not mean that the information we provided cannot be found any longer. You'll want to keep the following information sources in mind. Also, BuyBlue Colorado, an independent organization, will continue to remain operational.

This message was also followed by the statement that BuyBlue's data had been donated to the organization Advomatic.

On September 6, 2007, the site carried a message stating that 'BuyBlue 2.0' would be coming that fall, with the guide returning in a "more partisan and focused" form.

As of March 4, 2010, the site displayed a banner by Advomatic with the organization's slogan and a message stating that it is undergoing scheduled maintenance.

Media coverage
July 30, 2006  - Tuscaloosa News - Buying blue: Some shoppers research purchases to further political cause
June 15, 2006  - Fort Wayne Journal Gazette - Consumers buy with their beliefs
May 19, 2006  - United Press International (UPI) - Globe Talk: Money power vs. the NSA
April 22, 2006  - New York Times - Wal-Mart Flirts With Being Green
March 10, 2006  - Minneapolis Star-Tribune - Eco-friendly, fair-trade shopping choices getting easier to find
February 17, 2006  - The Detroit News - Shopping with your conscience
January 27, 2006  - The Detroit News - Bargains by the barrel
December 21, 2005 - VOA News, American Life - Christmas Shoppers Guided by Politics
November 8, 2005 - Pittsburgh Post-Gazette - Information Age breeds boycotts by the score
September / October 2005 - Ethical Consumer - Boycott Bush – Everybody’s doing it!
August 24, 2005 - The Boston Phoenix - Shop at your own risk
July 31, 2005 - The Boston Globe - Boycott mania: As business ethics fall, consumer activism rises
June 14, 2005 - San Francisco Bay Guardian - The MBNA factor
May 24, 2005 - MarketWatch.com - The color of money: Red states, blue states and credit-card affiliations
April 28, 2005 - The Insurance Journal - Turning Politics into Green for Favored 'Blue' Insurers
April 24, 2005 - Fort Worth Star Telegram - Purchase with a Purpose
April 16, 2005 - Tallahassee Democrat - Which way does your burger lean? Find Out.
February 15, 2005 - San Francisco Chronicle - Corporations painted in red and blue, S.F. man politicizes purchasing power
February 4, 2005 - East Bay Business Times - Web sites target companies for 'red' or 'blue' buyers
February 3, 2005 - Reason Online - Shop the Vote: The Era of One-Click Democracy
December 23, 2004 - CNN Inside Politics (TV) - Transcript
December 23, 2004 - The Bozeman Daily Chronicle - Democrats willing to put their money where their politics are
December 23, 2004 - The Detroit News - Web sites link politics and shopping
December 22, 2004 - San Francisco Chronicle Mark Morford's Column - Amazon.com Is For Republicans Attention, liberal shoppers!
December 20, 2004 - Le Monde - Les Americains partisans du "Merry Christmas" a l'offensive
December 20, 2004 - The Washington Times - Go vote with your wallet this Christmas
December 19, 2004 - The Dallas Morning News - Dems: Does that come in blue?
December 18, 2004 - The Washington Post - Some Put Money Where Their Politics Are
December 17, 2004 - FOXNews.com - Spending Some Green on Blue or Red
December 16, 2004 - TwinCities.com Pioneer Press - Partisan shoppers dreaming of a Red and Blue Christmas
December 14, 2004 - Chicago Tribune - Blue voters now urged to buy blue
December 11, 2004 - Cleveland Plain Dealer - Web site sees red over retailers' donations

References

External links
BuyBlue.org

Democratic Party (United States)
Consumer guides
American review websites